Kuşçu can refer to the following villages in Turkey:

 Kuşçu, Cide
 Kuşçu, Karakoçan
 Kuşçu, Keban
 Kuşçu, Polatlı